Nicholas John Rallis (born July 13, 1993) is an American football coach who is the defensive coordinator for the Arizona Cardinals of the National Football League (NFL). He played college football at Minnesota and previously served as an assistant coach for the Minnesota Vikings and Philadelphia Eagles.

Early life and education
Rallis was born on July 13, 1993, in Minneapolis, Minnesota. He attended Edina High School, being rated No. 8 in Minnesota by Rivals.com at the time of his graduation. As a sophomore, he recorded 81 tackles, one interception, and one sack, being named honorable mention all-Lake Conference. He played on both offense and defense during his junior year of high school, carrying the ball 54 times for 251 yards with five touchdowns on offense, and 72 tackles, 57 solo, on defense. He was named third-team all-metro by the Star-Tribune following the season. He tallied 13 tackles in his senior season before missing the rest due to an injury.

After his graduation from high school, Rallis played college football at University of Minnesota. He spent his first season, 2012, as a redshirt before appearing in ten games the following year. In 2013 he recorded seven tackles and was named Academic All-Big Ten. Rallis made his debut against UNLV, where he made three tackles. In his sophomore year, he played against Eastern Illinois, making three tackles, before suffering a season-ending injury against Middle Tennessee. As a junior in 2015, Rallis appeared in 13 games and made 18 tackles, including three for loss. He recorded a career-high nine tackles against Wisconsin. In his senior season, he appeared in 11 games, starting three, and made 37 tackles, 6.5 for loss and his first career sack. Against Wisconsin he led the team with 3 tackles for loss and recorded his only career sack against Washington State.

Coaching career
Rather than pursue a professional football career, Rallis accepted an offer by Wake Forest University as a quality control coach and graduate assistant. He spent one season at Wake Forest before being hired professionally by the Minnesota Vikings of the National Football League (NFL).

Minnesota Vikings 
Rallis was originally hired by the Vikings to work with computer breakdowns and opponent scouting but quickly moved up to the position of defensive quality control coach.

Philadelphia Eagles 
In 2021, he was hired by the Philadelphia Eagles to be their linebackers coach, making him the youngest position coach in the NFL. Rallis helped the Eagles reach the Super Bowl in 2022, while producing one of the best linebacking trios in the league in Hassan Reddick, Kyzir White, and T. J. Edwards.

Arizona Cardinals 
Rallis was hired as the defensive coordinator for the Arizona Cardinals on February 18, 2023, making him the youngest coordinator in the NFL. The move reunited him with head coach Jonathan Gannon, who served as the defensive coordinator of the Philadelphia Eagles during Rallis' tenure there.

Personal life
His brother Mike Rallis, known more popularly as Madcap Moss, is a professional wrestler in the WWE.

References

External links
Arizona Cardinals profile

1993 births
Living people
American football linebackers
Arizona Cardinals coaches
Minnesota Golden Gophers football players
Minnesota Vikings coaches
National Football League defensive coordinators
Philadelphia Eagles coaches
Players of American football from Minneapolis
Sports coaches from Minneapolis
Wake Forest Demon Deacons football coaches